Kambalath Govindan Nair (1914-1983) was an Indian freedom fighter, founder of a Teachers' Organization and a Malayalam poet in Kerala. He plays a major role in Malabar Rebellion by writing War Songs ( padappattu)

Life and career 
He was born in Nediyiruppu Village of Malappuram District in 1924. His parents were Kunhan Nair and Naniyamma.

Family 
He was married to Shinnammu Amma. They had 8 children.

War Song (Padappattu) 
In 1944, when Govindan Nair was working as a Clerk cum Bill Collector in Nediyiruppu Panchayath, a protest struggle started demanding the demolition of the Hitchcock memorial statue in Valluvambram. Hitchcock was the British District Police Officer who suppressed the Malabar Revolt. Govindan Nair was in the forefront of the protest. His war song (padappattu) titled "The Brave Children of Eranad" got widespread appreciation during and after the Indian independence struggle.

The Deshabhimani Weekly was confiscated by the British Government for publishing this war song of Kambalath Govindan Nair. It was prohibited then to keep this book or to sing the song.

Works 

 Onappudava

References

 

Indian independence activists from Kerala
1914 births
1983 deaths
Malayalam poets